The Korean field mouse (Apodemus peninsulae), also known as the Korean wood mouse, is a species of mouse. It is distributed across Northeastern Asia, including the Russian Far East, northern China, the Korean Peninsula, Sakhalin, and Hokkaidō. It is not found on the Korean island of Jeju. The adult has a body length of 76–125 mm, with a tail of nearly equal length (75–112 mm).

See also
 Soochong virus

References

External links
IUCN
Hantavirus report
Genetic-historical study

Mammals of Korea
Apodemus
Mammals described in 1907
Taxa named by Oldfield Thomas
Mammals of Japan